The Protestant Reformed Christian Church in Croatia is an overseas diocese of the Reformed Episcopal Church.

It was founded on 24 May 2001, when several parishes withdraw from the Reformed Christian Church in Croatia. The oldest parish was founded at Tordinci in 1551. There are parishes and missions in Zagreb, Osijek, Karlovac, Kapelna, Šibenik and Belgrade (Serbia). There is a mission church in Serbia in Belgrade.

The church confesses the Apostles Creed, the Nicene Creed, the Heidelberg Catechism and the 39 articles of the Anglican community and uses the Book of Common Prayer. The church came under the jurisdiction of the Reformed Episcopal Church in 2011.

The Protestant Reformed Christian Church in Croatia is a member of the World Reformed Fellowship. Contacts with the Reformed Churches in the Netherlands (Liberated) was also established.

See also 

Reformed Church in Zagreb

References 

Reformed Episcopal Church
Reformed denominations in Europe
Members of the World Reformed Fellowship
Christian organizations established in 2001
Protestantism in Croatia
2001 establishments in Croatia